Chevrolet 3800 may refer to:

Chevrolet 3800, a version of the Chevrolet Advance Design
Chevrolet 3800, a version of the Opel Rekord D
The  version of the Chevrolet 90° V6 engine